Lana: The Lady, the Legend, the Truth is a 1982 memoir by the American actress Lana Turner, published by Dutton. In it, Turner recalls her early life, her rise to stardom and personal troubles over the course of her career.

Synopsis
Turner recounts her early life growing up in Wallace, Idaho, and San Francisco, followed by her discover at age 16 in Hollywood by William R. Wilkerson. She recalls various anecdotes and personal experiences as a rising star for Metro-Goldwyn-Mayer, as well as her numerous romances, marriages and miscarriages. She also narrates the 1958 killing of Johnny Stompanato by her daughter, Cheryl Crane, during a domestic struggle, followed by her later career in film and television.

Critical response
Wayne Lawson of The New York Times wrote of the book,

The New York Timess Janet Maslin noted, "Lana Turner, though she isn't reflective or articulate even by movie star standards, has led a life that's a soap opera daydream. And she's got a one-of-a-kind Hollywood story to tell." Kirkus Reviews praised the book, writing, "Lana tells it all unpretentiously, unweepily; and the result--with nice little attacks along the way on Richard Burton, Ezio Pinza, Otto Preminger, Harold Robbins et al.--is a good old-fashioned celeb memoir, popcorn with spice, unashamedly Hollywood."

References

1982 non-fiction books
American memoirs
E. P. Dutton books
Memoirs set in Los Angeles
Lana Turner